The 1801 State of the Union Address was written by Thomas Jefferson, the third president of the United States, on Tuesday, December 8, 1801. It was his first annual address, and it was presented in Washington, D.C, by a clerk. He did not speak it to the 7th United States Congress, because he thought that would make him seem like a king.  He said, "Whilst we devoutly return thanks to the beneficent Being who has been pleased to breathe into them the spirit of conciliation and forgiveness, we are bound with peculiar gratitude to be thankful to Him that our own peace has been preserved through so perilous a season, and ourselves permitted quietly to cultivate the earth and to practice and improve those arts which tend to increase our comforts." During the address Jefferson proclaimed the Washington Doctrine of Unstable Alliances.

References

State of the Union addresses
Presidency of Thomas Jefferson
State of the Union Address
Works by Thomas Jefferson
State of the Union Address
State of the Union Address
State of the Union Address
7th United States Congress
December 1801 events
State of the Union